Growth hormone secretagogues or GH secretagogues (GHSs) are a class of drugs which act as secretagogues (i.e., induce the secretion) of growth hormone (GH). They include agonists of the ghrelin/growth hormone secretagogue receptor (GHSR), such as ghrelin (lenomorelin), pralmorelin (GHRP-2), GHRP-6, examorelin (hexarelin), ipamorelin, and ibutamoren (MK-677), and agonists of the growth hormone-releasing hormone receptor (GHRHR), such as growth hormone-releasing hormone (GHRH, somatorelin), CJC-1295, sermorelin, and tesamorelin.

Many of them also induce the secretion of insulin-like growth factor 1 (IGF-1), as well as of other hypothalamic-pituitary hormones such as prolactin and cortisol. The main clinical application of these agents is the treatment of growth hormone deficiency. They also see black market use, similarly to anabolic steroids, for bodybuilding purposes.

GHRH receptor agonists

Peptide
 GHRH (Somatocrinin, GRF, GHRF)
 CJC-1295 (DAC:GRF)
 Modified GRF (1-29) (CJC without DAC)
 Dumorelin
 Rismorelin
 Sermorelin (Geref, Gerel; GHRH (1-29))
 Somatorelin
 Tesamorelin (Egrifta)

Ghrelin (GHS) receptor agonists

Peptide
 Ghrelin (Lenomorelin, GHRL)
 GHRP-1
 GHRP-2 (Pralmorelin; GHRP Kaken 100; GHRP-2; KP-102, GPA-748, WAY-GPA-748)
 GHRP-3
 GHRP-4
 GHRP-5
 GHRP-6 (SKF-110679)
 Alexamorelin
 Examorelin (hexarelin; EP-23905, MF-6003)
 Ipamorelin (NNC 26-0161)
 Relamorelin (RM-131, BIM-28131, BIM-28163)
 Tabimorelin (NN-703)

Non-peptide
 Adenosine
 Anamorelin (ONO-7643, RC-1291, ST-1291)
 Capromorelin (CP-424391)
 Ibutamoren (MK-677, MK-0677, L-163191, LUM-201)
 Macimorelin (AEZS-130, JMV 1843)
 SM-130686

Note that while ulimorelin is a ghrelin receptor agonist, it is not a GHS as it is peripherally selective and has little or no effect on GH secretion.

See also 
 Hypothalamic–pituitary–somatic axis

References 

Growth hormone secretagogues